Vaneta Becker (October 9, 1949) is an American politician who serves as a Republican Senator in the Indiana Senate representing Senate District 50, which contains portions of Vanderburgh and Warrick County  in the southern part of the state. She sits on the Health and Provider Services Committee and chairs its Public Health Subcommittee having moved on from the Chairmanship of the Provider Services Subcommittee. She is the ranking member of the standing committee on Commerce, Public Policy and Interstate Cooperation.

Becker graduated from North High School in Evansville and received her Bachelor of Science degree at the University of Southern Indiana. She has been a real estate broker in Southwestern Indiana since 1975. Her husband, Andy Guarino, was a principal with Evansville-Vanderburgh School Corporation. He retired in 2013.

Becker was first elected to the Indiana House of Representatives in 1981 and served until 2005. She replaced Greg Server who was elevated to the Indiana Senate. She sits on numerous Interim Study Committees: the Evansville State Hospital Advisory Committee, Indiana Commission on Excellence in Health Care, Health and Child Care Issues Evaluation Committee, Health Finance Commission, Indiana Commission for Women, and the Prescription Drug Advisory Committee.

When Server was named to the Mitch Daniels administration, Becker was elected by a party caucus to replace him. Suzanne Crouch replaced her in the House.

When not in Indianapolis directly serving in the General Assembly, Senator Becker sits on the Board of Directors for the ARK Crisis Prevention Nursery and is involved with the Leadership Evansville Alumni.

She is a Co-Chair on the Advisory Board of the Office of Women's Health through the Indiana State Department of Health. Vaneta is also a member of the American Heart Association and the United Methodist Church.

Proposed national anthem legislation
In December 2011, Becker made headlines when she proposed legislation that set standards for the performance of the national anthem, including a fine of $25 to be levied against any individual that makes deliberate changes to the song.

References

Living people
Republican Party Indiana state senators
Women state legislators in Indiana
University of Southern Indiana alumni
Republican Party members of the Indiana House of Representatives
21st-century American politicians
American United Methodists
21st-century American women politicians
1949 births
20th-century American politicians
20th-century American women politicians